Parvez Ahmed Shahid (born 20 December 1948) is a retired banker and in his most recent role served as co-chairman of the Central Management Committee at Bank Alfalah from 2006 to 2011. Prior to this he worked for an international bank in which his last role was that of head of global treasury and resigned from BCCI in June 1991.

Shahid also served as the coordinator in Pakistan for Abu Dhabi Group , a group based in the United Arab Emirates and headed by Nahayan Mabarak Al Nahayan, a senior member of the Abu Dhabi Royal Family and Minister in the Federal Government of UAE. With Shahid and Nahayan's personal friendship going back to the 1970s, Shahid was jointly responsible along with his brother Bashir Tahir for bringing in foreign investment to Pakistan to the tune of over $1 billion.

Family and early life 
Shahid was born in Lahore, West Pakistan. His father, Sheikh Muhammad Zameer, was a banker by profession and worked for a bank owned by the Government of India, prior to the Independence of Pakistan. Shahid is the youngest amongst five siblings. His eldest brother, Khurshid Ahmed Tariq, is a retired banker, followed by Bashir Tahir and Jamshed Ahmed Anjum, who also happen to be retired bankers. His sister, Naseem Rauf, has done her MA in English from University of Punjab.

Education 
Shahid completed his Bachelor of Science from Forman Christian College, Lahore, Pakistan in 1971. In 1987, Shahid attended a course on options trading at the prestigious Insead in Font En Bleu, France. Shahid also attended a 3-month Finance and Management course in Tokyo, Japan, where he studied the style of management of Japanese institutions including but not limited to Daiwa Bank, Yamaichi Securities, Nomura Securities, Osakaya Securities, Toyota Motors, Panasonic, Nippon Kokun, and numerous others

Professional life

Bank of Credit and Commerce International 
Upon completing his education, Shahid joined BCCI in 1973 in Abu Dhabi, UAE. He assumed the role of Head of Central Support Office for Global Treasury Operations, United Kingdom from 1984 to 1986, after which he returned to Abu Dhabi and was given the charge as the bank's Joint Executive In-Charge of Treasury. Shahid resigned from the bank in June 1991 due to personal reasons and moved back to his country of birth the same year. Notable people who have worked with Shahid at BCCI are:

Consultancy 
From 1992 until 1996, Shahid worked as a consultant and managed a trading company along with some of his friends.

Bank Alfalah Limited 
Bank Alfalah Limited was acquired in 1997 by Abu Dhabi Group of UAE. Shahid led the bidding process as he was the authorised power of attorney holder of Nahayan Mabarak Al Nahayan. Formerly Pakistan's smallest bank with just three branches, Shahid led its acquisition and then nurtured the institution and his colleagues to become the country's 5th largest private bank  (6th largest if Pakistani Government owned National Bank of Pakistan is also included) with over 471 domestic and international branches in Bangladesh, Afghanistan and Bahrain. Shahid infused the highest international standards of customer service, innovation, technology, marketing, brand building, and finance into Bank Alfalah Limited.

At Bank Alfalah Limited, Shahid succeeded in creating a regional franchise with a virtually global presence as the bank has a high brand recall and recognition. Bank Alfalah Limited is an example of the institution which Shahid had, alongside an excellent and dedicated management team, built into a US$300 Million business from an initial, overall equity investment of only US$40 Million, thereby creating tremendous shareholder value translating into a potential 8x return on investment in 13 years (in case the bank were to be sold today and without taking into account the dividends that have been paid out so far).

Warid Telecom 
Dhabi Group, led by Nahayan Mabarak Al Nahayan decided to diversify from banking into other sectors such as communication, real estate, and other financial services. During the Government of Pervez Musharraf, two GSM licenses were auctioned and Nahayan Mabarak Al Nahayan, after the successful acquisition of Bank Alfalah Limited through Shahid, again nominated Shahid to act as his authorised power of attorney and Shahid jointly led the consortium of investors through the bidding process. After successfully acquiring the GSM license for $291 million, Shahid oversaw the rollout of Warid Telecom in Pakistan and dealt with global telecom giants such as Ericsson, Huawei, Motorola and IT companies including Cisco and IBM. As a member of the Board of Directors, Shahid was instrumental in using his banking resources to assist Warid Telecom in leapfrogging Mobilink as the operator with the highest number of postpaid customers in Pakistan.

Shahid was also instrumental in bringing on board brand ambassadors that included big names in the music and film industry such as Atif Aslam and Reema Khan.

Wateen Telecom 
In 2005, Wateen Telecom was launched by Abu Dhabi Group as a communication services provider. Shahid was a member of the Board of Directors until 2011. During his time at Wateen Telecom, Shahid played a pivotal role in deploying Pakistan's largest fibre optic network. Shahid also oversaw the largest countrywide roll-out of WiMax in the world.

Other Abu Dhabi Group companies 
Shahid served on the board of various Abu Dhabi Group companies that included Alfalah Insurance, Wincom, and Alfalah GHP Fund Management, an SECP-licensed asset management company.

Acquisition of United Bank Limited 
Shahid is well known in the business circles of the region for having spearheaded the successful bid and acquisition of a 51% controlling interest in Pakistanʼs 3rd largest bank, United Bank Limited, on behalf of a consortium consisting of Bestway Group of United Kingdom and UAE-based investors in 2002. Shahid negotiated a brilliant deal with the Government of Pakistan whereby a 51% majority shareholding in the bank was acquired for a total consideration of US$205 Million. The current market capitalisation of United Bank Limited is over US$1 Billion.

Post retirement 
Shahid is currently the chairman of [www.equityglobalgroup.com Equity Global], a financial advisory firm based in Lahore. As Chairman of Equity Global, and due to his strong network of relationships built over 40 years of financial sector experience in the region, he advises large corporations and ultra high-net-worth individuals on various investment banking and strategic private equity transactions.

Public service 
Shahid has also served as a board member of the Punjab Board of Investment and Trade (PBIT). He currently serves on the board of the Rising Sun Institute for Special Children. In addition, he is a member of the alumni board of governors of F.C. College Lahore, of which he is also the honorary treasurer.

References

External links 
 Abu Dhabi Group in Pakistan 

1948 births
Pakistani bankers
Pakistani Sunni Muslims
Living people
Pakistani financiers
People from Lahore
Bank of Credit and Commerce International people